George Edward Sealy Woodhouse  DL (15 February 1924 – 19 January 1988) had two careers: one as a cricketer for Somerset and Dorset, the second as the chairman from 1962 to his death of the family brewing company Hall and Woodhouse. As a cricketer, he was known as George Woodhouse; as a businessman, he was known as Edward Woodhouse.

Cricket career
Woodhouse was a right-handed middle-order batsman, a very occasional medium-pace bowler and, once in his first-class career, a wicketkeeper. He played a couple of times for Somerset in 1946, and then fairly regularly in both 1947 and 1948, winning his county cap in 1947 after an innings of 109 against Leicestershire which proved to be his only first-class century. 

In 1948, Somerset struggled to find a full-time captain, and Woodhouse officially shared the job with Mandy Mitchell-Innes and Jake Seamer, though at least two other players captained the side for occasional matches. In 1949, Woodhouse took over the captaincy full-time and played his only full season of cricket: he made 849 runs, though his highest score was only 59, at an average just below 20 runs an innings. He led the team to equal ninth in the County Championship table, and only three matches all season were drawn. But at the end of the season he stepped down to go into the family business, and he played only a few more times in first-class cricket, finally finishing in 1953.

Instead, he became a fairly regular player in Minor Counties cricket for Dorset, not retiring from second-class cricket until 1964.

Business career
Hall and Woodhouse is a family owned brewery in Blandford Forum, and Edward Woodhouse was the fourth generation of his family to become chairman when he took over in 1962. His own sons Mark and Anthony are now in charge of the company, which has expanded significantly in the past 25 years. 

Woodhouse was also a Deputy Lieutenant and High Sheriff of Dorset. 

He died suddenly from a heart attack.

References
 Wisden Cricketers' Almanack, 1947 to 1954 editions, plus Obituary in 1989
 CricketArchive.com
 Hall and Woodhouse website 

1924 births
1988 deaths
English cricketers
Somerset cricketers
Somerset cricket captains
Dorset cricketers
Combined Services cricketers
Deputy Lieutenants of Dorset
High Sheriffs of Dorset
People from Blandford Forum
Cricketers from Dorset
Free Foresters cricketers
Marylebone Cricket Club cricketers